Taarak is a 2003 Indian Telugu-language romantic drama film directed by Balasekaran and starring Taraka Ratna, Sharmili and Krishna.

Cast 

Nandamuri Taraka Ratna as Taraka "Taarak" Ram
Sharmili as Varsha 
Krishna as Jagadish Prasad
Jaya Prakash Reddy as JP 
Banerjee as College lecturer
Giri Babu
Tanikella Bharani
L. B. Sriram
Dharmavarapu Subramanyam
Sudhakar
Chitram Seenu
Ali
Srinivasa Reddy
Suman Setty
Kaushal
Murali Mohan (guest appearance)
Siva Krishna (guest appearance)
Seetu Singh (special song)

Production 
Sharmili made her Telugu debut with this film.

Soundtrack 
The music composed by Mani Sharma was well received.

Release and reception 
The film was scheduled to release on 11 April 2003 but was advanced to 3 April 2003.

Gudipoori Srihari of The Hindu opined that "The film has a vague story line and appears to have been influenced by a Hollywood movie. The characters are not well supported by dialogue. Tarak Ratna is a shade better and confident than what he looked in his earlier two films". Jeevi of Idlebrain.com gave the film a rating of three out of five and said that "The director tried to create an impact of that using the flashback. But the narrative meanders from the basic objective towards the love track between hero and heroine". Mithun Verma of Full Hyderabad wrote that "The movie's intentions were sacred, aiming at the increasingly suicidal youth. But the execution will definitely not decrease any, to say the least".

References

External links 

Indian romantic drama films
2000s Telugu-language films
Films directed by Balasekaran